Rapanea seychellarum, also known as Bwa Klate, is a species of plant in the family Primulaceae. It is endemic to Seychelles. It is sometimes considered to be a synonym of Rapanea melanophloeos, a mainland African species.

The species is assessed on the IUCN Red List as Critically Endangered, facing an extremely high risk of extinction in the wild; the population is estimated to number less than 50 mature individuals.

The main sites for the population are Mahé, Silhouette, and Praslin, though other studies have stated the apparent disappearance from Silhouette.

References

seychellarum
Critically endangered plants
Endemic flora of Seychelles
Taxonomy articles created by Polbot